= Put to sleep =

The term "put to sleep" may refer to:

- anesthesia
- animal euthanasia
- Actually helping something go to sleep
